The Bali–Java Powerline is a planned electric power transmission line in Indonesia. It will be used for the crossing of the Bali Strait between Java and Bali. As of January 2018, the project is underway with planning for land acquisition. However, as of April 2018, there are also indications that the project may never come to fruition as there is substantial resistance to the project for religious and cultural reasons.

The line on the Java side will begin in at the Paiton power plant, then through Watu Dodol in Banyuwangi Regency, and on to Bali. On the Bali side, it would be in parts of western Buleleng, Jembrana, Tabanan and Badung regencies.

References

Buildings and structures in Java
Buildings and structures in East Java
Buildings and structures in Bali
High-voltage transmission lines
Proposed electric power transmission systems
Proposed electric power infrastructure in Indonesia